Susanne Ellender Blakeslee is an American voice, stage and musical theatre actress. She is also known as Susan Blakeslee, Suzanne Blakeslee, and Suzanne Blakesley.

Among her notable roles are the voices of Wanda, Anti-Wanda, and Mrs. Turner on The Fairly OddParents; and as the voice of Maleficent in the Kingdom Hearts series and Disney media. In 2012, Blakeslee won an Ovation Award for Lead Actress in a Musical for Forbidden Broadway Greatest Hits, Volume 2.

Career

Stage
Blakeslee performed on the stage set of Forbidden Broadway from 1990 to 1994 and worked as the show's choreographer in 1994. Blakeslee won the Lead Actress in a Musical Ovation Award in 2012 for her performance in Forbidden Broadway Greatest Hits, Volume 2.

Voice acting
Blakeslee is noted for voicing Wanda, Anti-Wanda, and Mrs. Turner, for The Fairly OddParents franchise from 2001 to 2017, including 127 episodes of the television series, six specials and seven TV movies, as well as voicing these characters in the related Jimmy Timmy Power Hour trilogy: The Jimmy Timmy Power Hour, The Jimmy Timmy Power Hour 2: When Nerds Collide, and The Jimmy Timmy Power Hour 3: The Jerkinators.

Blakeslee has done extensive voice work for Disney, including animated features and theme park attractions at the Disneyland Resort, Walt Disney World and Tokyo Disney Resort. She has provided the voices of Cruella de Vil, the Evil Queen, Lady Tremaine, Maleficent and Madame Leota in Disney media since 2001.

Blakeslee has voiced-sound-alikes and original characters in Disney media. Her roles include:

 Kala in The Legend of Tarzan (replacing Glenn Close). 
 Delores Derceto and Ms. Birch in American Dragon:Jake Long.
 Flora in the Nightfall Glow attraction in Tokyo Disneyland.
 The Witch in the video game Brave.
 Old Lady Crowley in Rapunzel's Tangled Adventure (replacing Pat Carroll).
 Mrs. Quackfaster in the 2017 reboot series DuckTales.

Filmography

Live-action roles
Saved by the Bell: The New Class - Woman ("No Smoking", 1995)
The Home Court - Tricia ("Touched by an Anger", 1996)
Caroline in the City - Singing Woman ("Caroline and the Long Shot", 1997)
Ned's Declassified School Survival Guide - Wanda (voice; "Daydreaming", 2005)
The Fairly OddParents: Fairly Odder - Wanda (voice; 2022)

Anime roles
Vampire Princess Miyu - Machiko (ep. 8), Ja-Ka (ep. 10)

Animated roles
All Dogs Go to Heaven: The Series - Additional Voices 
All Hail King Julien - Butterfly Queen (episode "The Butterfly War")
American Dragon: Jake Long - Principal Dercerto
Amphibia - Valeriana
Be Cool, Scooby-Doo! - Charlene (episode "Poodle Justice")
Billy Dilley's Super-Duper Subterranean Summer - Hag Witch
Brandy & Mr. Whiskers - Rodent in Stands (episode "Go! Fight! Win!")
Bunsen Is a Beast - Wanda, Mrs. Turner (episode "Beast of Friends")
Channel Umptee-3 - Additional voices
Chowder - Witch, Abigail and Turtle Lady (episode "The Big Hat Biddies")
Cow and Chicken - Additional Voices
Crash Nebula - Princess Galaxandra
Danny Phantom - Dora Mattingly (Dorathea the Dragon Ghost)
Ducktales - Mrs. Quackfaster
Elena of Avalor - Ship Chandler
The Fairly OddParents - Wanda, Mrs. Turner, Anti-Wanda, additional voices
Fifi and the Flowertots - Webby (US Version)
Grandma for President - Grandma
Green Lantern: The Animated Series - Sayd
The Grim Adventures of Billy & Mandy - Crabina (episode "My Fair Mandy")
Hey Duggee - Additional Voices
Disney's House of Mouse - Cruella de Vil, Evil Queen
I Am Weasel - Loulabelle
It's Pony - Nana B
Kick Buttowski: Suburban Daredevil - Librarian
Kung Fu Panda: Legends of Awesomeness - Mei Ling (season 3)
The Legend of Tarzan - Kala
The Legend of Korra - Additional voice (episode: "Night of a Thousand Stars")
The Loud House - Mrs. Agnes Johnson, Mrs. Jelinsky
The New Woody Woodpecker Show - Mother Nature (1999–2001)
Oh Yeah! Cartoons - Wanda, Mrs. Turner
The Penguins of Madagascar - Ms. Trevor (Teacher) (episode "Field Tripped")
Phineas and Ferb - Additional Voices
The Powerpuff Girls - Sandra Practice (episode: "Girls Gone Mild")                                                                  
The Powerpuff Girls (2016) - Miss Moss, Additional voices (episode: "Staged Bombed", You're a Good Man, Mojo Jojo, Worship)
Rapunzel's Tangled Adventure - Lady Crowley (replaced Pat Carroll in season 3)
Roary the Racing Car - Big Christine
The Replacements - Mistress Serena (episode "Fiddlin' Around")
 Twirlywoos - The Very Important Lady
The Secret Saturdays - Rani Nagi, Dr. Miranda Gray
What's New, Scooby-Doo? - Penelope Bailey (episode "Recipe for Disaster")
Winx Club - Griselda, Bloom's Guardian of Sirenix
The Zula Patrol - Black Zulean Chess Queen

Movie roles
101 Dalmatians II: Patch's London Adventure - Cruella de Vil
A Fairly Odd Movie: Grow Up, Timmy Turner! - Wanda
A Fairly Odd Christmas - Wanda
A Fairly Odd Summer - Wanda
Aladdin and the Adventure of All Time
Cinderella II: Dreams Come True - Lady Tremaine
Cinderella III: A Twist in Time - Lady Tremaine
Disney Princess Enchanted Tales: Follow Your Dreams - Narrator
Ernest & Celestine - Additional Voices
Howl's Moving Castle - Additional Voices
Mickey's House of Villains - Cruella de Vil
My Life as a Courgette - Ms. Paterson, Zucchini's mother
Planet 51 - Additional Voices
Shrek the Third - Evil Queen
Star Tours - Kaink (from Star Wars: Ewoks)
The Jimmy Timmy Power Hour series - Wanda, Mrs. Turner, Anti-Wanda, additional voices
Tales from Earthsea - The Queen
Tangled - Additional Voices
Winx Club: The Secret of the Lost Kingdom - Griselda

Video game roles
102 Dalmatians: Puppies to the Rescue - Cruella de Vil
Arc the Lad: Twilight of the Spirits - Selkis
BioShock - Julie Langford, various Splicers
BioShock 2 - Lady Smith Splicers
Coraline - Miss Forcible, Other Forcible
Destroy All Humans! - Rural Crazy
Destroy All Humans! 2: Make War Not Love - Additional voices
Diablo 3 - Maghda
Disney Infinity 3.0 - Maleficent
Disney Villains Challenge - Maleficent, Lady Tremaine, Cruella de Vil
Disneyland Adventures - Madame Leota
Epic Mickey - Madame Leota
EverQuest II - Generic Bixie Enemy, Generic Centaur Enemy, Generic Dark Elf Enemy, Generic Barbarian Guard
Evil Dead: Regeneration (2005) - Female Deadite #2, Female Deadite #3
Final Fantasy XIV - Various
Freelancer - Additional voices
God of War - Village Oracle, Oracle of Athens
God of War III - Gaia
God of War: Ascension - Village Oracle (cameo)
Kingdom Hearts - Maleficent
Kingdom Hearts II - Maleficent, Twilight Town Computer
Kingdom Hearts Birth by Sleep - Maleficent, Lady Tremaine, Evil Queen
Kingdom Hearts Re:coded - Maleficent
Kingdom Hearts 3D: Dream Drop Distance - Maleficent
Kingdom Hearts HD 1.5 ReMIX - Maleficent
Kingdom Hearts HD 2.5 ReMIX - Maleficent, Lady Tremaine, Evil Queen, Twilight Town Computer
Kingdom Hearts HD 2.8 Final Chapter Prologue - Maleficent
Kingdom Hearts III - Maleficent
Kingdom Hearts: Melody of Memory - Maleficent
Lands of Lore III - Jaden, Rosalinda
Nicktoons: Movin' - Wanda
Nicktoons Unite! - Wanda
Nicktoons: Battle for Volcano Island - Wanda
Nicktoons: Attack of the Toybots - Wanda
Nox - Woman 1-3
Scooby-Doo! Unmasked - Dame Nella Vivante
Scooby-Doo! Who's Watching Who?- Henrietta Bascombe and the Scare Pair
Shadows of the Damned - Sister Grim Shisatsu
Spider-Man: Shattered Dimensions - Madame Web
Spyro: A Hero's Tail - Ineptune
Summoner 2 - Bashra, Perduellion, Nepanthies
Sword of the Berserk - Dunteth's Wife
Tarzan - Kala
Tarzan: Untamed - Kala
The Fairly OddParents: Breakin' Da Rules - Wanda, Mrs. Turner
The Fairly OddParents: Shadow Showdown - Wanda
The Nightmare Before Christmas: Oogie's Revenge - Helgamine the Big Witch
Treasure Planet: Battle at Procyon - Admiral Amelia

Theme parks
Wishes - Evil Queen (voice)
Fantasmic! - Cruella de Vil (voice)
Halloween Screams - Maleficent (voice)
HalloWishes - Maleficent (voice)
Magic, Music and Mayhem - Flora (voice)
Haunted Mansion Holiday - Madame Leota (voice)
Jimmy Neutron's Nicktoon Blast - Wanda (voice)
Nightfall Glow - Flora (voice, uncredited)
Disney's Fantillusion! - Flora (voice, uncredited)
Sorcerers of the Magic Kingdom - Cruella de Vil (voice), Flora (voice, uncredited), Maleficent (voice)

Stage shows
Disney Live! Mickey's Magic Show - Evil Queen (voice)
Disney on Ice: Disneyland Adventure - Maleficent (voice)
Disney on Ice: Let's Celebrate - Cruella de Vil (voice), Evil Queen (voice), Maleficent (voice)
Disney on Ice: Princess Classics - Lady Tremaine (voice)
Dream Along With Mickey - Maleficent (voice)
Hocus Pocus Villain Spelltacular - Maleficent (voice)
The Disney Villains Mix and Mingle - Maleficent (voice)
Three Classic Fairy Tales - Evil Queen (voice), Lady Tremaine (voice)

Stage appearances
Forbidden Broadway 1990, Theatre East, New York City, 1990
Forbidden Broadway 1991 ½, Theatre East, 1991–92
Forbidden Christmas, Theatre East, 1991–92
Forbidden Broadway featuring Forbidden Christmas, Theatre East, 1992
Forbidden Broadway 1993, Theatre East, 1993
Forbidden Broadway 1994, Theatre East, 1994
On the Twentieth Century as Dr. Johnson, UCLA Freud Playhouse, Los Angeles, 2003
What If?, Hudson Main Stage, Los Angeles, 2004

Stage work
Choreographer, Forbidden Broadway 1994, Theatre East, New York City, 1994

Discography
 Disney Princess Cinderella Read-Along Storybook and CD (2009/Disney Book Group) - Lady Tremaine
 Disney Songs and Story: Cinderella (2009/Walt Disney Records) - Lady Tremaine

Awards and nominations
Ovation Awards
2012: Won the award for Lead Actress in a Musical for her role as Woman 1 in the Musical Theatre West production of "Forbidden Broadway Greatest Hits, Volume 2"

References

External links

Living people
American musical theatre actresses
American stage actresses
American video game actresses
American voice actresses
20th-century American actresses
21st-century American actresses
Year of birth missing (living people)